Léo Louis Seydoux (born 16 March 1998) is a Swiss professional footballer who plays as a right-back for Belgian First Division B club Beerschot on loan from Westerlo.

Club career
Seydoux made his professional debut with Young Boys in a 2–0 Swiss Super League win over St. Gallen on 26 September 2018.

On 9 January 2021, he signed a 3.5-year contract with Westerlo in Belgium. On 30 July 2022, Seydoux moved on loan to Beerschot, with an option to buy.

Honours 
Young Boys

 Swiss Super League: 2018–19

Westerlo

 Belgian First Division B: 2021–22

References

External links
 
 SFL Profile
 BSCYB Profile
 SFV U17 Profile
 SFV U18 Profile
 SFV U19 Profile
 SFV U20 Profile

1998 births
Living people
Swiss men's footballers
Switzerland youth international footballers
Switzerland under-21 international footballers
Association football fullbacks
BSC Young Boys players
Neuchâtel Xamax FCS players
K.V.C. Westerlo players
K Beerschot VA players
Swiss Super League players
Challenger Pro League players
Swiss expatriate footballers
Expatriate footballers in Belgium
Swiss expatriate sportspeople in Belgium
Sportspeople from the canton of Fribourg